The Serb National Alliance or Serbian People's Alliance of Republika Srpska (Srpski narodni savez RS) was a Serb political party in Bosnia and Herzegovina, active in the Republika Srpska entity (one of two entities comprising the state of Bosnia and Herzegovina, where the majority of Bosnian Serbs live).

History

Establishment and early years
Due to a growing isolation of Republika Srpska after the peace was signed (14 December 1995), Biljana Plavšić severed her ties with the Serb Democratic Party and formed the Serb National Alliance, and nominated Milorad Dodik, then member of the National Assembly of the Republika Srpska whose Alliance of Independent Social Democrats-party had only two MPs, for Prime Minister.

This marked the beginning of political reform in Republika Srpska and the cooperation with the International Community. She lost the 1998 election to the joint candidate of the Serb Democratic Party and the Serbian Radical Party of the Republika Srpska, Nikola Poplašen. She was a candidate of the reform Sloga ("Solidarity" or "Unity") coalition. Her political career was in decline until the release of the indictment by the ICTY, after which it was completely terminated.

National Assembly of Republika Srpska membership
The National Assembly is the legislative body of Republika Srpska. The current assembly is the seventh since the founding of the entity.

Positions held

See also
Biljana Plavšić

References

National Assembly of the Republika Srpska: O Nama

Political parties in Republika Srpska
Serb political parties in Bosnia and Herzegovina
Defunct political parties in Bosnia and Herzegovina